"Just tah Let U Know" is a song by Eazy-E. It was one of Eazy-E's last recorded tracks before his death.  It was released posthumously as the only single on the album Str8 off tha Streetz of Muthaphukkin Compton and as a single on December 5, 1995.  It was Eazy-E's final single to chart, and peaked at #45 on the Billboard Hot 100, #30 on Hot R&B/Hip-Hop Singles & Tracks, and at #4 on Hot Rap Singles.

Music video
The music video was released in 1995 and was done after Wright's death, it shows various footages of him and pictures. The music video features cameo appearances by MC Ren, DJ Yella, Bone Thugs-N-Harmony, Too Short, Kadeem Hardison, Bokeem Woodbine, Above The Law, BG Knocc Out, Gangsta Dresta, The Pharcyde, Rudy Ray Moore, Theo Mizuhara, and many more.

In the music video, Bokeem Woodbine plays a rap artist named 'Eric' who refuses to fairly pay his partner, played by Kadeem Hardison. In the video, Hardison's character grows angrier because he doesn't get his fair share of money & calls Eric out on his selfishness. Hardison's character would eventually try to murder Eric, but instead gets shot by Eric's assistant, which turned out to be a false memory.

Charts

Single Track Listing
"Just Tah Let U Know" (Single Version) - 4:09
"Just Tah Let U Know" (Phat Sac Remix) - 4:09
"Just Tah Let U Know" (Instrumental)- 4:09

References

External links

1995 songs
Eazy-E songs
MC Ren songs
Gangsta rap songs
G-funk songs